"Losing My Religion" is the twenty-seventh episode and the season finale of the second season of the American television medical drama Grey's Anatomy, and the show's 36th episode overall. Written by Shonda Rhimes and directed by Mark Tinker, the episode was originally broadcast with "Deterioration of the Fight or Flight Response", in a two-hour season finale event on the American Broadcasting Company (ABC) in the United States on May 15, 2006. Grey's Anatomy centers around a group of young doctors in training. In this episode, Dr. Izzie Stevens (Katherine Heigl) and her fellow interns have to plan a prom for Dr. Richard Webber's (James Pickens, Jr.) niece Camille Travis (Tessa Thompson). Further storylines include Dr. Preston Burke (Isaiah Washington) recovering from his gunshot wound and Denny Duquette's (Jeffrey Dean Morgan) death following his seemingly-successful heart transplant surgery.

The episode marked Sara Ramirez's (Dr. Callie Torres) final appearance with recurring billing, as she would be upgraded to a series regular in season three. Morgan, Ramirez, Thompson, Brooke Smith, Sarah Utterback, Loretta Devine and Chris O'Donnell reprised their roles as guest stars, while Hallee Hirsh and Tiffany Hines made their first and only appearances. The episode received mixed reviews from television critics, who disapproved of the storyline involving Grey and Shepherd and the show's lack of repercussions for the interns, but lauded Dr. Cristina Yang's (Sandra Oh) storyline along with Heigl's performance. "Losing My Religion" was also included in several "best episodes" lists. Upon its initial airing, the episode was viewed 22.50 million Americans, garnered an 8.0/22 Nielsen rating/share in the 18–49 demographic, ranking fifth for the week in terms of viewership, and registering as the week's second highest-rated drama.

Plot
Dr. Derek Shepherd (Patrick Dempsey) and Dr. Richard Webber (James Pickens, Jr.) finish Dr. Preston Burke's (Isaiah Washington) surgery to remove a pseudo-aneurysm in the subclavian artery that threatened the functioning of his arm and which was caused by a gunshot wound. At the same time, Dr. Erica Hahn (Brooke Smith) successfully transplants a heart into Denny Duquette (Jeffrey Dean Morgan). The interns face Webber, who orders them to plan a prom for his dying niece, Camille Travis (Tessa Thompson), until the one who cut Duquette's left ventricular assist device (LVAD) comes forward. With the instructions of Camille's friends, Claire (Hallee Hirsh) and Natalie (Tiffany Hines), they prepare the prom as they each struggle with their own personal problems. Trying to recover from his injury, Burke finds a tremor in his right hand.

Dr. Meredith Grey's (Ellen Pompeo) love interest Dr. Finn Dandrige (Chris O'Donnell), the vet of Doc—the dog she shares with Shepherd—informs her that Doc has had several seizures due to his bone cancer and that she and Shepherd have to make a decision. Webber interrogates the interns individually about Duquette's LVAD wire, but only learns about their personal problems instead. Dr. Izzie Stevens (Katherine Heigl) finally accepts Duquette's marriage proposal. At Dandridge's office, Grey and Shepherd, joined by Dr. Addison Montgomery-Shepherd (Kate Walsh), decide to put Doc to sleep.

The hospital staff begins to arrive at the prom and Dr. Callie Torres (Sara Ramirez) and Dr. George O'Malley (T. R. Knight) discuss the status of their relationship, which leads to the former admitting her love and commitment. During the dance, Grey and Shepherd escape Dandridge and Montgomery to have a heated argument that leads to sexual intercourse. In the meantime, as Duquette waits for Stevens alone in his room, he experiences a sudden sense of pain, and unexpectedly dies. While Webber is sitting in the operating room gallery and reflecting on his career, Dr. Miranda Bailey (Chandra Wilson) announces Duquette's death.

News of the death spreads, and the interns hurry to his room to find a shocked Stevens, lying on the bed, clinging to his still form. As they each try to comfort her, the cause of his death is revealed to have been a blood-clot that led to a fatal stroke. Stevens says that if she had taken less time to dress, she would have arrived at his room sooner and could have been with him while he died. Dr. Alex Karev (Justin Chambers) then talks to Stevens, picking her up and hugging her as she cries. Afterward, Dr. Cristina Yang (Sandra Oh), who did not know how to handle Burke's situation, goes to his room and puts her hand on his to show him her support. As the episode ends, Stevens confesses to Webber that she was the one responsible for the LVAD wire cut, and claiming she cannot be a surgeon, quits the program. After everyone begins going their separate ways, Grey remains torn on who she should follow: Shepherd or Dandridge.

Production
The episode was written by series creator Shonda Rhimes and directed by filmmaker Mark Tinker, while Ed Ornelas edited it. It was the last episode to feature Sara Ramirez as a guest star, as she began receiving star billing in the season three premiere. Morgan, Ramirez, Thompson, Smith, Utterback, Devine, and O'Donnell reprised their roles as Duquette, Torres, Travis, Hahn, Harper, Adele, and Dandridge, respectively, while Hirsh and Hines made their first and only appearances as Claire and Natalie, respectively. The soundtrack of the episode consisted of Pete Droge's "Under the Waves", Dressy Bessy's "Side 2", Amos Lee's "Colors", Masha Qrella's "Destination Vertical", Kate Havnevik's "Grace", and Snow Patrol's "Chasing Cars". The American profile of Northern Irish band Snow Patrol increased after their single was used in this episode. Lead singer Gary Lightbody was initially uncertain about licensing a song for the soundtrack, but has since admitted that the publicity had a positive effect.

Rhimes entitled the episode "Losing My Religion" because she felt "that is what happens to each intern in this episode. Each intern lets go of the things they've held onto all season. George lets go of loving Meredith. Cristina lets go of her well-checked emotions. Izzie is forced to let go of her idealism, and that leads to her letting go of medicine. Alex lets go of his rage against Izzie. And Meredith ... well, Meredith just lets go." The costumes were designed by Mimi Melgaard; Rhimes noted that everyone was dressed in dark funeral colors to the prom, except Stevens who was dressed in pink. Stevens' dress was an Amsale creation. Monologues done by the 5 main characters were used in this episode. Rhimes commented: "this was something we'd never done and I wasn't sure would work. But you place those pages into the hands of the actors and each and every one of them layered their characters' souls right into the dialogue." The episode's theme was the prom; Rhimes said she wanted to do it since the beginning of the season.

Reception

"Losing My Religion" was originally broadcast on May 15, 2006 in the United States on the American Broadcasting Company (ABC), along with "Deterioration of the Fight or Flight Response". The episodes were watched by a total of 22.50 million Americans. It represents a slight decrease in comparison to the episode airing the previous night, "17 Seconds", which garnered 22.60 million viewers. The episode received an 8.0/22 Nielsen rating/share in the 18–49 demographic, ranking fifth for the week in terms of viewership, and registering as the week's second highest-rated drama. The episode's rating outranked CBS's The New Adventures of Old Christine and CSI: Miami, the National Broadcasting Company (NBC)'s The Apprentice, and the Fox Broadcasting Company's 24.

The episode received mixed reviews among critics. Joel Keller of The Huffington Post expressed mixed opinions on the episode, putting the emphasis on Yang's development, whom he deemed "transformed" by the end of the episode. He applauded Torres' evolution throughout the episode, and also praised Heigl's performance and dress. Keller criticized the non-realism of the punishment the interns received, Grey and Shepherd's storyline being tiresome, and the cliffhanger, calling it a "lame cliché". Writing for the Chicago Tribune, Maureen Ryan gave a mixed review of the episode, stating: "overall, the whole thing just fell a little flat." Though Ryan appreciated the scene of Doc's death, she was critical of Torres' underdevelopment, her lack of chemistry with O'Malley, and her prom dress. Abigail Chao of Television Without Pity was also critical of Torres' dress, but liked Heigl's pink dress. She also applauded Karev's intervening to calm Stevens down, and agreed that Grey's cliffhanger was not good.

Eyder Peralta of The Houston Chronicle criticized Stevens' ethics for cutting Duquette's LVAD wire, writing that she "should not be practising medicine". Alan Sepinwall, a former television columnist for The Star-Ledger, commented favorably on Karev "finally displaying some humanity" in the scene following Duquette's death. He was critical of Shepherd's arc, however, and on the absence of severe consequences for Stevens having cut the LVAD wire, an action he called "insane and dangerous".

This episode was included on the list for the "25 Sexiest TV Shows on DVD" by magazine Entertainment Weekly. It was also listed in Entertainment Weekly "20 Unforgettable Proms" and in StarPulse's "Top 10 TV Proms". AOL TV placed the hook-up scene involving Grey and Shepherd on its Top 20 Of TV's Sexiest Scenes. In 2009, TV Guide ranked "Losing My Religion" #63 on its list of the 100 Greatest Episodes. In 2013, the magazine named Duquette's death one of TV's Most Heartbreaking Deaths. In December 2011, Wetpaint named "Losing My Religion" one of the 5 best episodes of the series.

References

External links
"Losing My Religion" at ABC.com

2006 American television episodes
Grey's Anatomy (season 2) episodes
Television episodes about proms